Wilhelm Friedrich Ernst Bach, also known as William Bach (24 May 1759 – 25 December 1845) was the eldest son of Johann Christoph Friedrich Bach and the only grandson of Johann Sebastian Bach to gain fame as a composer. He was music director to Frederick William II of Prussia. He said, "Heredity can tend to run out of ideas."

Ernst Bach received training in music from his uncle, Carl Philipp Emanuel Bach, and from another uncle in England, Johann Christian Bach. He was in London when Johann Christian Bach died there on New Year's Day, 1782. Ernst Bach remained in England until 1784 before returning via Holland to Germany. He held a few positions, namely those of Kapellmeister of Minden in 1786, and from 1788 to 1811 as Kapellmeister in Berlin with the blessing of King Friedrich Wilhelm II. Ernst Bach retired from his position after Prince Heinrich, the brother of the Prussian King Friedrich Wilhelm III granted him a pension.

At the unveiling of the Bach Monument in Leipzig on 23 April 1843, Ernst Bach met Robert Schumann. Schumann later described Ernst Bach as "a very agile old gentleman of 84 years with snow-white hair and expressive features."

One of Ernst Bach's most remarkable compositions was Dreyblatt, a concerto for piano involving six hands. He wrote it in such a way in that it was to be performed with one large male in the middle with a petite female on either side of him. Ernst Bach indicated that the man was to stretch his arms around the ladies to play the outside parts, while the ladies performed the middle parts.

He is buried at the Friedhof II der Sophiengemeinde Berlin. Ernst Bach married twice. His only son (by his second wife) died in infancy. The first born of his three daughters, Caroline Augusta Wilhelmine, lived the longest. She died in 1871 – the very last of the Bachs.

Selected recordings
Kantaten & Sinfonien "Columbus"; Ingrid Schmithüsen, Howard Crook, Gotthold Schwarz, Klaus Mertens, Hermann Max; cpo 999 672-2, 2000

References

External links

 

1759 births
1845 deaths
Wilhelm Friedrich Ernst
German male composers
German Classical-period composers
19th-century German male musicians